Tadjenanet District (Arabic: تاجنانت), formerly called Saint-Donat, is a town in eastern Algeria, belonging to the wilaya of Mila and home to 53 536 inhabitants (in 2008). The city is best known for its weekly market, considered the first in eastern Algeria. and which is the main cause of economic progress of the city in recent years. district of Mila Province, Algeria.

The district is further divided into 3 municipalities:
Tadjenanet
Ouled Khalouf
Benyahia Abderrahmane

Districts of Mila Province